From the Place in the Valley Deep in the Forest is a short-story collection by American writer Mitch Cullin, and is the author's fifth book.  It was first published as a trade paperback in November 2001 by Dufour Editions in the US. A UK trade paperback edition was published by Weidenfeld & Nicolson in January 2005.  In 2007, the Italian publisher FBE released a trade paperback translation of the collection as Da Quel Luogo Nella Valle Dentro La Foresta.

The collection was given a starred review from Booklist in its December 12, 2001 publication.

Contents
Several of the stories in the collection had been published previously in literary magazines, although they were greatly revised for the book and often given new titles.  Three of the eight stories were previously unpublished.  The stories are listed below in the order in which they appear in the book.

Footnotes

2001 short story collections
American short story collections